Tall Man is a compilation album and 61st overall album by American country singer Johnny Cash, released on Bear Family Records in 1979 (see 1979 in music). Like the preceding two Bear Family Cash releases, it consists of rarities and unreleased songs. "Besser So, Jenny-Jo" and "Kleine Rosemarie" were recorded in German for that audience.  "Tall Man" is from the soundtrack to the 1961 film Cindy, and was listed when released by Cash as the 'B' side to "Tennessee Flat Top Box" as "Tall Men". "Pick a Bale of Cotton" and "Hammers and Nails" were previously released as singles.  "Rodeo Hand" is an outtake from Sings the Ballads of the True West. "Engine 143," an A.P. Carter song, which was re-recorded for a Carter Family tribute album in 2003.

Track listing

References

Tall Man
Tall Man
Bear Family Records compilation albums